USS Jack Williams (FFG-24), sixteenth ship of the  of guided-missile frigates, was named for Pharmacist's Mate Third Class Jack Williams, who was posthumously awarded the Medal of Honor for his heroism in the Battle of Iwo Jima.

Construction and career

Ordered from Bath Iron Works, Bath, Maine, on 28 February 1977 as part of the FY77 program, Jack Williams was laid down on 25 February 1980; launched on 30 August 1980, sponsored by Mrs. Fern Williams Carr, sister of PhM3c Williams; and commissioned on 19 September 1981.

in 1983, the ship accidentally launched a live MK-46 torpedo while berthed at Naval Station Mayport in Florida. The torpedo skidded across the top of a concrete pier but did not detonate.

Jack Williams (FFG-24) was the first ship of that name in the US Navy.

References

External links 

 

1980 ships
Oliver Hazard Perry-class frigates of the United States Navy
Oliver Hazard Perry-class frigates of the Bahraini Navy
Ships built in Bath, Maine
Cold War frigates and destroyer escorts of the United States